E. S. Engelsberg (23 January 1825, Engelsberg (now Engelsberg in Schlesien, in the Bruntál District), Austrian Silesia - 27 May 1879, Deutsch Jaßnik (Jeseník nad Odrou) was a Silesian-Austrian composer.

Eduard Schön used the pseudonym Engelsberg or ES Engelsberg after the village he was born. Schön studied at the Faculty of Philosophy of University of Olomouc and then law at the University of Vienna, finishing in 1850. Later, he worked as a section leader at Ministry of Finance and as general secretary of Stock Exchange in Vienna.

Composer
Schön composed his first songs and piano pieces while studying in Olomouc.

During the revolution in 1848 he composed the student song "German Song of Freedom" (Deutsch Freiheitslied).

Later, Engelsberg primarily composed church music together with several instrumental works. He also set several law texts to music.

1825 births
1879 deaths
Austrian male composers
People from Austrian Silesia
People from Bruntál District
Palacký University Olomouc alumni
19th-century composers
19th-century male musicians